The Shawnee Street Overpass (also known as the Shawnee Road Bridge) is an overpass in Kansas City, Kansas, United States. The bridge allows traffic Shawnee Road to go over South 7th Street, a section of U.S. Route 169. It was completed in 1932; the engineer of the bridge is unknown. It was added to the Register of Historic Kansas Places on August 27, 1983. It was placed on the National Register of Historic Places on March 8, 1984.

The bridge was fully rebuilt in 2005.

References

External links
National Register of Historic Places website

Bridges in Kansas City, Kansas
Bridges completed in 1932
Road bridges on the National Register of Historic Places in Kansas
National Register of Historic Places in Kansas City, Kansas
Steel bridges in the United States
U.S. Route 169